Mohammed Hussein al-Ammar is a citizen of Saudi Arabia who the Kingdom put on its most wanted list. He was placed on the list in 2016, along with 8 other men.

Al-Ammar was captured by Saudi authorities on January 8, 2019, in the Al-Bahari district of Qatif, Eastern Province.  His capture left just three of those nine men at large.  The other five had all died.  Al-Ammar was captured, in spite of firing upon the arresting officers when they called upon him to surrender.

Authorities reported he had, in his hideout, a molotov cocktail, a machine gun, two pistols, a large supply of ammunition, and a cache of currency.  Asharq al-Awsat reports al-Ammar was accompanied by several confederates, during the shootout, one of whom died.

Asharq al-Awsat reports that, in 2017, he "masterminded" the kidnapping of Sheikh Mohammed bin Abdullah Al-Jirani.  They reported that his subordinates were Abdullah Ali Al Darwish, Mazen Al Qaba, Mustafa Salman Al Sihwan, Maitham Al Qadihi and Ali Bilal Al Hamad. Al-Ammar and his confederates eventually murdered Al-Jirani, a judge in the Endowments and Inheritance Department.

References

Fugitives
Saudi Arabian criminals